Pallacanestro Messina was an Italian professional basketball team based in Messina, Sicily.

History
Established in 1976, the club was admitted to the first division Serie A for the 2003-04 season after Virtus Bologna was excluded for financial irregularities.
Messina struggled on every front during that season, finishing dead last in the league whilst suffering from financial problems and a lack of interest from the public.
With debts too big to allow the club to even take part in other divisions and scaring off clubs that wanted to buy the side's sporting rights, Messina went bankrupt a few months after the season.

Notable players 
  Agostino Li Vecchi 3 seasons: '99-'00, '02-'04
  Gerrod Abram 2 seasons: '99-'01
  Marques Bragg 2 seasons: '99-'00, '02-'03
  Charles Smith 1/2 season: '00
  Malcolm Mackey 1 season: '00-'01
   Scooter Barry 1 season: '00-'01
  Cristiano Grappasonni 1 season: '00-'01
  Chris Carrawell 1 season: '00-'01
  Brian Oliver 2 seasons: '01-'03
  Lamarr Greer 1 season: '01-'02
   Sharif Fajardo 1 season: '01-'02
  Manuel Vanuzzo 1 season: '01-'02
  Saddi Washington 1 season: '01-'02
  Herman Smith 1 season: '02-'03
  Leonardo Busca 1 season: '02-'03
  Matt Bonner 1 season: '03-'04
  Marlon Garnett 1 season: '03-'04
  Marquis Estill 1 season: '03-'04
  Leonardo Busca 1 season: '03-'04
  Vincent Yarbrough 1 season: '03-'04

Sponsorship names
Throughout the years, due to sponsorship, the club has been known as:
Ina Sicilia Barcellona (1999-2000)
Media Broker Messina (2000-2001)
Sicilia Messina (2003-2004)

References

External links
Serie A historical results  Retrieved 23 August 2015

1976 establishments in Italy
2004 disestablishments in Italy
Messina
Basketball teams in Sicily
Messina